Sanaul Huq (23 May 1924 – 4 February 1993) was a Bangladeshi poet, translator, and educationist.

Early life and education 

Huq was born in Chowra village, Brahmanbaria District to Zahurul Huq and Syeda Husaini Begum. He matriculated in 1939 from Annada School in Brahmanbaria, did his Intermediate Examinations in 1941 from Dhaka Intermediate College and his BA Honors (economics) in 1944 and MA in 1945 from University of Dhaka. He also earned his BL degree in 1946.

Works
 Nodi O Manusher Kavita (1956)
 Sombhoba Onannya (1962)
 Surya Onyotor (1963)
 Bichurna Arshite (1968)
 Ekti Ichcha Sahasra Paley (1973)
 Kal Samakal

Awards 
 Bangla Academy Literary Award (1964)
 UNESCO Award (1965)
 Lekhok Sangho Prize (1965)
 Ekushey Padak (1983)
 Alokto Sahitya Prize (1985)

References 

1924 births
1993 deaths
Recipients of the Ekushey Padak
University of Dhaka alumni
Academic staff of the University of Dhaka
Bangladeshi male poets
Recipients of Bangla Academy Award
Bangladeshi translators
20th-century translators